Aricia is a genus of butterflies in the family Lycaenidae. The genus was erected by Ludwig Reichenbach in 1817.

Species
Listed alphabetically within groups:

 agestis group:
Aricia agestis ([Denis & Schiffermüller], 1775) – brown argus
Aricia artaxerxes (Fabricius, 1793) – northern brown argus
Aricia cramera (Eschscholtz, 1821) – southern brown argus
Aricia montensis Verity, 1928
 anteros group:
Aricia anteros (Freyer, 1838) – blue argus
Aricia bassoni Larsen, 1974
Aricia crassipuncta (Christoph, 1893)
Aricia morronensis (Ribbe, 1910) – Spanish argus
Aricia vandarbani (Pfeiffer, 1937)
 chinensis group:
Aricia chinensis (Murray, 1874)
 nicias group:
Aricia dorsumstellae (Graves, 1923)
Aricia hyacinthus (Herrich-Schäffer, [1847])
Aricia isaurica (Staudinger, 1871)
Aricia nicias (Meigen, 1829) – silvery argus
Aricia teberdina (Sheljuzhko, 1934)
Aricia torulensis Hesselbarth & Siepe, 1993

References

 
Butterfly genera
Taxa named by Ludwig Reichenbach